The Pacific sea nettle (Chrysaora fuscescens), or West Coast sea nettle, is a common planktonic scyphozoan that lives in the eastern Pacific Ocean from Canada to Mexico.

Sea nettles have a distinctive golden-brown bell with a reddish tint. The bell can grow to be larger than one meter (three feet) in diameter in the wild, though most are less than 50 cm across. The long, spiraling, white oral arms and the 24 undulating maroon tentacles may trail behind as far as 15 feet (4.6 m). For humans, its sting is often irritating, but rarely dangerous.

Chrysaora fuscescens has proven to be very popular for display at public aquariums due to their bright colors and relatively easy maintenance. It is possible to establish polyps and culture Chrysaora in captivity. When provided appropriate aquarium conditions, the medusae do well under captive conditions.

Taxonomy
Johann Friedrich von Brandt described this species in 1835. The origin of the genus name Chrysaora lies in Greek mythology with Chrysaor, brother of Pegasus and son of Poseidon and Medusa. Translated, Chrysaor means "he who has a golden armament". The species name fuscescens is Latin for "dark into light".

Distribution and habitat
Chrysaora fuscescens is commonly found along the coasts of California and Oregon, though some reside in the waters north to the Gulf of Alaska, west to the seas around Japan and south to the Baja Peninsula. The populations reach their peak during the late summer. In recent years, C. fuscescens has become overly abundant off the coast of Oregon, which is thought to be an indicator of climate change. However, others suspect that the population is increasing because of human influences to coastal regions.

Feeding and predators

In common with other cnidaria, Chrysaora fuscescens are carnivorous animals. They catch their prey by means of cnidocyst (or nematocyst) -laden tentacles that hang down in the water. The toxins in their nematocysts are effective against both their prey and humans, though it is typically nonlethal to the latter. Because C. fuscescens cannot chase after their prey, they must eat as they drift. By spreading out their tentacles like a large net, the sea nettle is able to catch food as it passes by. When prey brushes up against the tentacles, thousands of nematocysts are released, launching barbed stingers which release a paralyzing toxin into the quarry. The oral arms begin digestion as they transport the prey into the sea nettle's mouth.

C. fuscescens feeds on a wide variety of zooplankton, crustaceans, salps, pelagic snails, small fish as well as their eggs and larvae, and other jellyfish. Due to their growing numbers, they seem to be reducing fish populations and have become nuisances to the fisherman of Oregon by clogging up fishing nets. Their dense swarms have also become problematic for scientific trawls and water intake.

Despite having a potent sting, Chrysaora fuscescens is prey to many marine birds and large fish.

Physiology

Chrysaora fuscescens swim using jet propulsion by squeezing their bell and pushing water behind them, allowing them to swim against currents, although most of the time they prefer to simply float. Sometimes they pick up hitchhikers, including small fish and crabs, which hide inside the sea nettle's bell and may feed on it.

The Chrysaora fuscescens use light sensing organs called ocelli to migrate from the deeper waters of the ocean to the surface.

Reproduction

Chrysaora fuscescens is capable of both sexual reproduction in the medusa stage and asexual reproduction in the polyp stage. The life cycle of C. fuscescens begins when females catch sperm released by the males to fertilize the eggs she has produced and is holding in her mouth. These fertilized eggs remain attached to her oral arms, and there they grow into flat bean-shaped planula. Once they grow into flower-shaped polyps, they are released into the ocean where they attach themselves to a solid surface and undergo asexual reproduction. The polyp makes identical copies of itself by means of budding, where the new polyp grows from its side. After the new polyp is fully formed, it too is released into the ocean and undergoes metamorphosis as it grows, developing a bell, arms, and tentacles until it is a fully formed medusa.

References

External links

chrysaora
Animals described in 1835
Cnidarians of the Pacific Ocean
Articles containing video clips